Clifford James Tyson (18 September 1909 – 14 January 1991) was an Australian rules footballer who played with North Melbourne and Melbourne in the Victorian Football League (VFL).

Notes

External links 

1909 births
1991 deaths
Australian rules footballers from Victoria (Australia)
North Melbourne Football Club players
Melbourne Football Club players